Giancarlo Gandolfo (born November 17, 1937) is an Italian economist. He has been a Professor of International Economics at Sapienza University of Rome from 1974 to 2010. Gandolfo is notable for his popular graduate-level textbook on dynamic economic theory.

Selected works

References

External links 
 Gandolfo's website

1937 births
Living people
Italian economists
Sapienza University of Rome alumni
Academic staff of the Sapienza University of Rome